Dionne may refer to:
Dionne (name)
 Centre Marcel Dionne, a multi-purpose arena in Quebec, Canada
 Dionne Lake in Nunavut, Canada
 Dionne quintuplets, the first quintuplets known to have survived their infancy
 USS Dionne (DE-261), a destroyer escort ship of the United States Navy during World War II
"Dionne", song by Prince Crystal Ball (box set)

See also
Dion (disambiguation)
Dione (disambiguation)